Ralph Nader has authored, co-authored and edited many books, which include:

Books 
 Unsafe at Any Speed. Grossman Publishers, 1965.
 Action for a Change (with Donald Ross, Brett English, and Joseph Highland). Penguin (Non-Classics); Rev. edition, 1973.
 What To Do With Your Bad Car: An Action Manual For Lemon Owners (with Lowell Dodge and Ralf Hotchkiss). Grossman Publishers, 1971.
 Whistle-Blowing (with Peter J. Petkas and Kate Blackwell). Bantam Press, 1972.
 Ralph Nader, Joel Seligman, and Mark J. Green. Taming the Giant Corporation. Paperback ed. Norton, W. W. & Co., Inc., 1977.
 Nader, Ralph, and John Abbotts. Menace of Atomic Energy. Paperback ed. Norton, W.W. & Co., Inc.,. 1979.
 You and Your Pension (with Kate Blackwell)
 The Consumer and Corporate Accountability
 In Pursuit of Justice
 Corporate Power in America (with Mark J. Green) Penguin Books, 1977.
 Ralph Nader Congress Project
 Ralph Nader Presents: A Citizen's Guide to Lobbying
 Verdicts on Lawyers
 Who's Poisoning America (with Ronald Brownstein and John Richard)
 The Big Boys (with William Taylor)
 Nader, Ralph, and Wesley J. Smith. Winning the Insurance Game: the Complete Consumer's Guide to Saving Money. Hardcover ed. Knightsbridge Pub., 1990.
 Nader, Ralph, and Clarence Ditlow. Lemon Book: Auto Rights. 3rd ed. Asphodel Pr., 1990.
 Nader, Ralph, and Wesley J. Smith. Collision Course: the Truth About Airline Safety. 1st ed. McGraw-Hill Co., 1993.
 "Children First! A Parent's Guide to Fighting Corporate Predators" (with Linda Coco) Corporate Accountability Research Group, 1996.
 Nader, Ralph, and Wesley J. Smith. No Contest: Corporate Lawyers and the Perversion of Justice in America. Hardcover ed. Random House Pub. Group, 1996.
 Canada Firsts (with Nadia Milleron and Duff Conacher)
 The Frugal Shopper (with Wesley J. Smith. )
 Getting the Best from Your Doctor (with Wesley J. Smith. )
 Nader on Australia
 Nader, Ralph. Cutting Corporate Welfare. Paperback ed. Open Media, 2000.
 The Ralph Nader Reader. Seven Stories Press, 2000. 
Crashing the Party, 2002.  
 Civic Arousal Paperback ed. Harper Publishing, 2004. 
 "It Happened in the Kitchen: Recipes for Food and Thought"
 "Why Women Pay More" (with Frances Cerra Whittelsley)
 Nader, Ralph. The Good Fight: Declare Your Independence and Close the Democracy Gap. Paperback ed. Harper Collins Pub., 2004. 
 "The Seventeen Traditions" Regan Books, 2007. 
 Citizen Power: A Mandate for Change by Mike Gravel, 2008. Foreword by Ralph Nader.
 Only the Super-Rich Can Save Us! Seven Stories Press, 2009. 
 Getting Steamed to Overcome Corporatism Common Courage Press, 2011.
 The Seventeen Solutions: Bold Ideas for Our American Future HarperCollins, 2012.
 Told You So: The Big Book of Weekly Columns. Seven Stories Press, 2013. 
Unstoppable: The Emerging Left–Right Alliance to Dismantle the Corporate State. Nation Books, 2014. 
Return to Sender: Unanswered Letters to the President, 2001–2015. Seven Stories Press, 2015. .
 Breaking Through Power: It's Easier Than We Think. City Lights Open Media, 2016. 
Animal Envy (a collection of fables) 
 How the Rats Re-formed the Congress, 2018  
To the Ramparts - How Bush and Obama Paved the Way for the Trump Presidency, and Why It Isn’t Too Late to Reverse Course, Seven Stories Press, Aug. 2018, 
The Ralph Nader and Family Cookbook: Classic Recipes from Lebanon and Beyond (Akashic Books, 2020)

Articles 
 The "I" Word - Boston Globe - May 31, 2005 - Nader calls for the impeachment of President George W. Bush (with Kevin Zeese)
 Letter to Senate Judiciary Committee on Alito Nomination — Jan. 10, 2006
 Bush to Israel: 'Take your time destroying Lebanon' — The Arab American News — Aug. 2006
 Bill Moyers For President Nader on Bill Moyers running for President in 2008, October 28, 2006

Selected speeches and interviews 
Radio interview of Ralph Nader about the Consumer Financial Protection Bureau and corporate tax loopholes on Democracy Now!.

Ralph Nader Speech at the Covair Society of America.

References 

 
 

Bibliographies by writer
 
Bibliographies of American writers
Journalism bibliographies